Denise Murray (born March 8, 1964 - September 15, 2020) was a Canadian female country music singer. Signed to Loggerhead Records in 1997, Murray released her debut album, What You Mean to Me, which included the top ten hit "Has Anybody Seen My Angel", which reached No. 10 on the RPM Country Tracks chart in Canada. The success of the album led to nominations from the Canadian Country Music Association and the RPM Big Country Awards. A second album for Loggerhead, Under the Moon, followed in 2000 and included the top 25 hit "Boom", which reached No. 25 on the RPM Country Tracks chart in 2000. Murray died from cancer at the age of 56 on September 15, 2020.

Discography

Albums

Singles

Music videos

References

Canadian women country singers
Canadian country singer-songwriters
1964 births
2020 deaths